Richard William Barraclough (born 6 March 1943) is a retired British wrestler. He competed in the men's freestyle 82 kg at the 1972 Summer Olympics. He also represented England in the 90 kg light-heavyweight, at the 1970 British Commonwealth Games in Edinburgh, Scotland.

References

External links
 

1943 births
Living people
British male sport wrestlers
Olympic wrestlers of Great Britain
Wrestlers at the 1972 Summer Olympics
Place of birth missing (living people)
Wrestlers at the 1970 British Commonwealth Games
Commonwealth Games competitors for England